Tshepo Maseko (born 7 March 1974), is a South African actor. He is best known for his roles in the popular serials Isidingo, Vehicle 19 and More Than Just a Game.

Personal life
He was born on 7 March 1974 in South Africa. He obtained his National Diploma in Drama from the Pretoria Technikon currently known as Tshwane University of Technology. After few years, he became the Radio Announcer on Motsweding FM.

He is married to Masego Morapedi since 2013. The couple has three daughters.

Career
He started his career at the age of 13. In 1998, he made television debut with the serial Isidingo where he played the role 'Parsons Matabane' for several years. In 2005, he appeared in the short film Blow and played the lead role 'Nick'. Then in 2007, he made his film debut with Poena Is Koning. In 2008, he established a clothing line called 'Phologolo Active Wear' (PAW).

He also acted in the serial #Karektas as Celebrity Guest and then on the serial Ba Kae? as Host. In 2011, he won the Award for the Best Lead Actor in a TV Soap at the SAFTA. In the same year, he contested for the M-Net reality competition Survivor South Africa: Maldives as a celebrity contestant. In 2013, he acted in the blockbuster international film Vehicle 19. In the film, he plated the role 'Lieutenant'.

He hosted the Season Eight of adult education reality show It's For Life aired on SABC2. Then he appeared in the short The Ring. Meanwhile, from 2012 to 2013, he became the host of religious music program Gospel Classics of the Season Two.

Television roles
 #Karektas as Celebrity Guest
 Ba Kae? as Host
 Broken Vows as T
 Diamond City as Kgosi
 Gospel Classics as Host
 Isidingo as Parsons Matabane
 Like Father Like Son as Themba Sibeko
 Lithapo as Brian
 MTV Shuga as Robert
 Saints and Sinners as Thabang Moloiswa
 Shine as Judge
 Skwizas as Samson
 Streets of Mangaung as Senior Constable Raps Modisane
 Survivor South Africa as Contestant
 The Ring as Tshepo/Thabo

Filmography

References

External links
 

Living people
South African male television actors
South African male film actors
1974 births